Casper Stevenson (born 22 April 2003) is a British racing driver who is scheduled to compete for D'Station Racing in the FIA World Endurance Championship. He previously raced in the GT World Challenge Europe for the AKKodis ASP Team and became Euroformula Open rookies' champion in 2021.

Early career

Karting 
Stevenson mainly developed his karting career in the United Kingdom, racing in the various classes of the Super 1 National Kart Championships.

Ginetta Junior Championship 
Stevenson made his car racing debut in the winter series of the Ginetta Junior Championship in November 2018, before a full-time entry the following year with Richardson Racing. He finished the season 6th overall with nine podiums, and 2nd in the rookie standings behind Zak O'Sullivan.

Formula 4 
In November 2019, following an assessment day at Silverstone, Stevenson won the inaugural F4 British Championship scholarship prize. He subsequently signed with new team Argenti Motorsport, which took over reigning champions Double R Racing's cars, for 2020. He started the year off with consistent points finishes, before a run of nine consecutive podiums halfway through the season propelled him to 3rd in the standings. He achieved his first two wins in cars at Silverstone and Croft in the process.

Euroformula Open 
Though initially planning to race in the Formula Regional European Championship for Van Amersfoort Racing in 2021, for which he prepared during the winter in Asian F3, Stevenson ended up joining the team in the Euroformula Open instead. He took two wins throughout the season on his way to 6th in the standings, and was crowned rookies' champion.

Sportscar career

2022: Debut in GT3 
Stevenson competed in the Gulf 12 Hours in January 2022, driving a Mercedes-AMG GT3 Evo for 2 Seas Motorsport. He finished fourth overall and third in his class, alongside gentleman drivers Ian Loggie and Morgan Tillbrook. Stevenson gained praise after a competitive stint that saw him close in on platinum-rated factory driver Ben Barnicoat, in what was his professional sportscar racing debut.

He then contested the GT World Challenge Europe for the AKKodis ASP Team, partnering Tommaso Mosca and Konstantin Tereshchenko in the Endurance Cup and Thomas Drouet in the Sprint Cup. Having taken six podiums from his first seven races before racing at the historic Spa 24 Hours in late July, Stevenson finished runner-up in the Silver class of the Sprint Cup and ninth in the Endurance Cup.

2023: Step-up to the WEC 
In 2023, Stevenson moved to Aston Martin Racing to make his debut in the FIA World Endurance Championship, driving for the TF Sport-operated D'station Racing team in the GTE Am class alongside Satoshi Hoshino and Tomonobu Fujii.

Personal life 
Stevenson has cerebral palsy. This has caused him trouble in his racing career, most notably facing mobility problems in the Tatuus F3 T-318, which led to his switch from the Formula Regional European Championship to Euroformula in 2021.

Racing record

Racing career summary 

† As Stevenson was a guest driver, he was ineligible for a championship position.
* Season still in progress.

Complete F4 British Championship results 
(key) (Races in bold indicate pole position) (Races in italics indicate fastest lap)

Complete F3 Asian Championship results
(key) (Races in bold indicate pole position) (Races in italics indicate the fastest lap of top ten finishers)

Complete Euroformula Open Championship results 
(key) (Races in bold indicate pole position; races in italics indicate points for the fastest lap of top ten finishers)

Complete GT World Challenge Europe Endurance Cup results
(Races in bold indicate pole position) (Races in italics indicate fastest lap)

Complete GT World Challenge Europe Sprint Cup results
(key) (Races in bold indicate pole position) (Races in italics indicate fastest lap)

Complete FIA World Endurance Championship results
(key) (Races in bold indicate pole position) (Races in italics indicate fastest lap)

* Season still in progress.

References

External links 
 

Living people
2003 births
British racing drivers
Euroformula Open Championship drivers
Ginetta Junior Championship drivers
Van Amersfoort Racing drivers
F3 Asian Championship drivers
Double R Racing drivers
British F4 Championship drivers
People with cerebral palsy
FIA World Endurance Championship drivers